The 1997 Big 12 men's basketball tournament was the postseason men's basketball tournament for the Big 12 Conference. It was played from March 6 to 9 in Kansas City, Missouri at Kemper Arena. Kansas won the tournament for the 1st time and received the conference's automatic bid to the 1997 NCAA tournament.

Seeding
The tournament consisted of a 12 team single-elimination tournament with the top 4 seeds receiving a bye.

Schedule

Bracket

All-Tournament Team
Most Outstanding Player – Paul Pierce, Kansas

See also
1997 Big 12 Conference women's basketball tournament
1997 NCAA Division I men's basketball tournament
1996–97 NCAA Division I men's basketball rankings

References 

Big 12 men's basketball tournament
Tournament
Big 12 men's basketball tournament
Big 12 men's basketball tournament
College sports tournaments in Missouri